Tormé: A New Album is a 1977 studio album by Mel Tormé.  The album has also been re-issued as, Mel Tormé: The London Sessions and with additional "bonus" tracks as A New Album, London Sessions Complete Edition.

Tormé had not released a studio album since 1969, and the late 1970s would see him return to recording, with critical and commercial success.

Track listing
LP side A
 "All in Love Is Fair" (Stevie Wonder)
 "The First Time Ever I Saw Your Face" (Ewan MacColl)
 "New York State of Mind" (Billy Joel)
 "Stars" (Janis Ian)
LP side B
 "Send in the Clowns" (Stephen Sondheim)
 "Ordinary Fool" (Paul Williams)
 Medley
"(Ah, the Apple Trees) When the World Was Young" (M. Philippe Gerard, Angela Vannier, Johnny Mercer)
"Yesterday When I was Young" (Charles Aznavour, Herbert Kretzmer)
 "Bye Bye Blackbird" (Mort Dixon, Ray Henderson)
Bonus tracks on Paddle Wheel Records' A New Album, London Sessions Complete Edition CD re-issue:
"It's Too Late"
"Never Look Back"
"Charade"
"Like A Lover"
"What's This"

Personnel

Performance
 Mel Tormé - vocals, arranger
 Phil Woods - alto saxophone
 Gordon Beck - keyboards
 Barry Miles
 Vic Juris - guitar
 Brian Hodges - electric bass
 Terry Silverlight - drums
 Christopher Gunning - arranger, conductor

References

Gryphon G 796 (LP, A New Album)
Gryphon G 916 (LP, A New Album)
Rhapsody CD 3 (CD, A New Album)
DCC (Compact Classics) (1990 CD, The London Sessions)
Paddle Wheel KICJ 128 (CD, Mel Tormé - A New Album, London Sessions Complete Edition)

1977 albums
Mel Tormé albums